Chariesterini is a tribe of leaf-footed bugs in the family Coreidae. There are at least 4 genera and more than 20 described species in Chariesterini.

Genera
These four genera belong to the tribe Chariesterini:
 Chariesterus Laporte, 1833
 Plapigus Stål, 1860
 Ruckesius Yonke, 1972
 Staluptus Stål, 1860

References

Further reading

External links

 

 
Articles created by Qbugbot
Coreinae
Hemiptera tribes